The Capitol Police Emergency Assistance Act of 2021 is an Act of the United States Congress.

President Joe Biden signed the Act into law on December 22, 2021.

The Act authorizes the Chief of the Capitol Police to request the assistance of Federal agencies in emergencies.

United States Capitol Police Chief J. Thomas Manger said the Department is "grateful for the additional safety measure" provided by the Act.

References 

Aftermath of the January 6 United States Capitol attack
Acts of the 117th United States Congress